Mario + Rabbids may refer to:

 Mario + Rabbids Kingdom Battle, a 2017 video game by Ubisoft
 Mario + Rabbids Sparks of Hope, a 2022 video game by Ubisoft

Also the DLCs of these games are:-

 Mario + Rabbids Kingdom Battle: Donkey Kong Adventure, a 2018 DLC of Mario + Rabbids Kingdom Battle 
 The Tower of Doooom, a first DLC of Mario + Rabbids Sparks of Hope set to release in early 2023

The other 2 DLCs set to release in mid and late 2023. But, the name of these games is not announced.

See also 

 Mario (franchise)
 Rabbids